Tilarán is a canton in the Guanacaste province of Costa Rica. The head city is in Tilarán district.

History 
Tilarán was created on 21 August 1923 by decree 170.

Geography 
Tilarán has an area of  km² and a mean elevation of  metres.

The canton surrounds Lake Arenal except for the lake's southeast end, which belongs to the province of Alajuela. The northern border is in the Cordillera de Guanacaste, touching the Corobicí River at its northernmost limits. The southern part of the canton is in the Cordillera de Tilarán (mountain range).

Districts 
The canton of Tilarán is subdivided into the following districts:
 Tilarán
 Quebrada Grande
 Tronadora
 Santa Rosa
 Líbano
 Tierras Morenas
 Arenal
 Cabeceras

Demographics 

For the 2011 census, Tilarán had a population of  inhabitants.

Transportation

Road transportation 
The canton is covered by the following road routes:

Notable people
Leonidas Flores - Retired footballer
 Carlos Palacios Herrera - Professional cyclist
 Luis Esteban Herrera - Pianist
 Doris Murillo Boniche - Local artist. Retired art professor.
 Danadith Tayals - Poet
 Mark List - Driver on the Monster Jam circuit

References 

Cantons of Guanacaste Province
Populated places in Guanacaste Province